Wellington Court (formerly Red Barracks) is a former barracks overlooking Weymouth Harbour in Weymouth, Dorset, England. It has been converted to housing and apartments. The original building is Grade II listed.

History
Red Barracks were first conceived and built as cavalry barracks in 1795–6. The barracks were rebuilt in 1801 around a parade area, following a fire in 1798, and used as infantry barracks, with accommodation for 17 officers and 270 men. There was also a 30-bed hospital. The barracks were built because King George III understood the need to improve Great Britain’s defences against potential invasion by Napoleon’s French troops. The barracks were one of three built in Weymouth. During the Napoleonic Wars, the barracks stationed troops from Hanover.

The main three-story block is to the southwest of where the parade ground was located. It is a long rectangular building with four doorways facing what was the parade ground. There are sash windows.

There is a plan of the barracks dating from 1907 in the UK National Archives.
The site was sold in 1984 for subsequent redevelopment as Wellington Court.

The site is located on Barrack Road, which leads to Nothe Fort. Weymouth Peace Garden (formerly a burial ground) is located immediately adjacent to the site and Nothe Gardens are close by to the location.

See also
 Hope Square
 Nothe Parade

References

External links
 

1795 establishments in England
Military installations established in 1801
Grade II listed buildings in Dorset
Barracks in England
Buildings and structures in Weymouth, Dorset